Herbert Franklin Walker (October 22, 1898 – December 21, 1962), nicknamed "Laudie", was an American Negro league third baseman in the 1920s.

A native of Wilkinsburg, Pennsylvania, Walker made his Negro leagues debut in 1921 with the Pittsburgh Keystones and Homestead Grays. He went on to play for the Grays again in 1922 and 1924, his final professional season. Walker died in his hometown of Wilkinsburg in 1962 at age 64.

References

External links
 and Seamheads

1898 births
1962 deaths
Homestead Grays players
Pittsburgh Keystones players
Baseball third basemen
Baseball players from Pennsylvania
People from Wilkinsburg, Pennsylvania
20th-century African-American sportspeople